Typhoon is a Russian family of Mine-Resistant Ambush Protected (MRAP) armored fighting vehicles (AFVs) in service since 2014.
Around 120 Russian companies including KamAZ, Gaz-Group, and Bauman University, etc. are taking part in Typhoon program. The main aim of the program is to design a fundamentally new unified platform for all Russian armored wheeled vehicles.

Role
The Typhoon family of armored vehicles is intended for the troop transport (armoured personnel carrier) role, and through the installation of various special equipment or weapon modules allows its use in specialized roles such as self propelled anti-aircraft artillery, unmanned aerial vehicles carriers, cranes, tow trucks and others.

History
The history of the "Typhoon" family began in 2010, when Minister of Russian Federation Armed Forces approved the "Development of Russian Federation Armed Forces military vehicles for the period until 2020" program which includes "Typhoon MRAP program". The first vehicles were shown in 2011.

Design
All Typhoon variants use the same family of engines (JMZ-536), information and management system, mine protection and suspension. Mine protection is provided by a V-shaped bottom, energy absorbing seats and explosion corresponds to 3b in accordance with STANAG 4569 (explosive device up to 8 kg of TNT). All utilize composite body armor (ceramic and steel), as well as provide bulletproof round protection on the fourth level of the standard STANAG 4569 (14.5 mm armor-piercing bullets B-32). All armored personnel carrier variants can have installed a remotely controlled machine-gun unit. In the vehicle roof are hatches for emergency evacuation of personnel in case of a rollover. Along the perimeter of armored vehicles there are mounted video cameras that allow crewmen to monitor the situation without leaving the transport module, and to control the vehicle in the event of an inability to use the windshield. Habitable space on all machines is sealed for chemical, biological, radiological and nuclear defense, and is supported by maintaining the crew and troop compartment at an artificial overpressure through a HLF-100 air filtration system. All vehicles are available in two, three or four axle versions.

Variants
There are two primary manufacturers: Kamaz and Ural.

KAMAZ

 Kamaz-63968 Typhoon-K Modular MRAP vehicle.
 KamAZ-63969 Solid-body, 6×6 wheeled amphibious armoured personnel carrier (APC) with a remote-controlled gun.
 KamAZ-53949 Typhoon-L MRAP – 4×4 wheeled patrol armoured personnel carrier (APC). Renamed into Phoenix after an import substitution program was completed in 2023.
 K-4386 Typhoon-VDV – 4×4 vehicle armed with 30 mm 2A42 autocannon and accommodating 8 personnel. In service for Russian Airborne Troops and available for export since 2021. The Naparnik escort and control vehicle was developed on its basis and adopted in September 2021.
 Linza – The medevac version using the K-53949 chassis is named Linza. Linza can transport up to 10 wounded soldiers.

Ural

 Ural-63095 and Ural-63099 Typhoon – The Ural Typhoons are Multirole modular 6×6 MRAP Infantry mobility vehicle vehicles. The 63095 model has a crew of 3 + 16 in module. The 63099 model has a crew of 3 + 12 in module.

SPATGM version
SPATGM version armed with eight ready-to-launch Kornet-EM anti-tank guided missiles mounted on two separate masts.

References

External links

Wheeled armoured fighting vehicles
Wheeled armoured personnel carriers
Military engineering vehicles
Armoured fighting vehicles of Russia